Rolph Ludwig Edward Schwarzenberger (7 February 1936 – 29 February 1992) was a British mathematician at the University of Warwick who worked on vector bundles (where he introduced jumping lines), crystallography, and mathematics education.

He was President of the Mathematical Association in 1983–1984.

Publications

 Schwarzenberger translated this book into English and added a long appendix on later developments.

References

1936 births
1992 deaths
20th-century British mathematicians